The Hard Corps is a 2006 American action film directed and written by Sheldon Lettich. It stars Jean-Claude Van Damme, Raz Adoti, Vivica A. Fox, and Peter James Bryant. It is the fourth collaboration between Jean-Claude Van Damme and film director Sheldon Lettich. The film was released direct-to-DVD in the United States on August 15, 2006.

Plot
Phillip Sauvage (Jean-Claude Van Damme) is an American soldier recovering from Post-Traumatic Stress Disorder caused by his time in Iraq and Afghanistan in a VA hospital. The release of notorious rap mogul Terrell Singletery (Viv Leacock) from prison has caused Wayne Barclay's (Raz Adoti) worried older sister and manager Tamara (Vivica A. Fox) to hire increased security. Wayne, a retired heavyweight champion turned businessman and community leader, is apparently a target of Terrell's who's known to issue hits on his enemies. A member of Wayne's staff named Mullins served with Clarence Bowden (Julian D. Christopher) in the Army and brings him in on the security detail; he, in turn, brings Sauvage, whom he mentored in the Army as well.

During their first gig doing security outside a club, Terrell sends a hit squad for Wayne. Clarence is killed and Sauvage arrested for possession of an automatic weapon. After bailing him out, Tamara moves him into Wayne's guest house and hires him as head of security. Sauvage insists on bringing in his own colleagues for the security team, but Wayne forces him to train members of his boxing gym. Sauvage brings on fellow veteran Sergeant Casey Bledsoe (Mark Griffin) to train the recruits. Tamara is apparently smitten by Sauvage, who shows little interest, but her advances worry Wayne, who is informed by Detective Teague that Sauvage is actually an unstable killer who massacred children in Iraq.

Terrell sends another hit squad to stake out Wayne's girlfriend's place (Lydia) to try to hit him again; Wayne tries to sneak out to see her because Tamara does not approve. Sauvage catches him and insists on going with him. While Sauvage inspects an alley, Kujo (another bodyguard with them) sees the hit squad. After a struggle, Wayne's men manage to subdue the hit squad and leave them for the police.

The next day, Sauvage tries to dissuade Wayne from giving a speech at a sports complex opening, but he becomes angry with Sauvage's restrictions. When they see a suspicious man in the crowd, Sauvage orders the new guards to take him down, causing a riot. The man was only reaching for his cell phone and Wayne is embarrassed by the bad press. Sauvage quits and insists on fighting Wayne to prove his methods are sound. Tamara storms off and Sauvage sends Jesse, a female guard, with her.

After a vicious fight between Wayne and Sauvage, they hear that Jesse was attacked and Tamara taken. Detective Teague suspiciously asks if they heard anything about Tamara, which they did not mention. In the car, Sauvage and Wayne discuss the true Iraq incident and Terrell and Wayne's history. Lydia calls and insists Wayne come see her alone (unbeknownst to them with a gun to her head) and Sauvage hatches a plan. Wayne discovers Detective Teague inside, who has been working for Terrell, and Sauvage cuts the power. He and the guards break in and apprehend the thugs and learn that Tamara is at Terrell's house.

Wayne and his guards pose as Terrell's thugs to get inside his gate and confront him. Sauvage and Bledsoe secure Tamara and Wayne and Mullins take on Terrell's boys. The fight culminates in Wayne killing Terrell and Sauvage being shot but saved by his vest. In the aftermath, Wayne comes to terms with Tamara and Sauvage's relationship, and they kiss.

Cast

Production
It was filmed at Vancouver, British Columbia, Canada.

Release
Sony Pictures Home Entertainment released the DVD in the United States on August 15, 2006.

Reception 
Beyond Hollywood wrote that the film's slow pacing and buildup do not live up to direct-to-video fans' expectations, though it is better than contemporary Steven Seagal films.  Ian Jane of DVD Talk rated it 2.5/5 stars and wrote, "While The Hard Corps has a few shining moments, overall it's just not all that compelling".

References

External links
 
 

2006 films
2006 action films
2006 direct-to-video films
American action films
American direct-to-video films
Films directed by Sheldon Lettich
Films shot in Bucharest
Films shot in Vancouver
Sony Pictures direct-to-video films
2000s English-language films
2000s American films